This is a list of villages and settlements in Sokoto State, Nigeria organised by local government area (LGA) and district/area (with postal codes also given).

By postal code

By electoral ward
Below is a list of polling units, including villages and schools, organised by electoral ward.

References
Estimate population (Nigerian population census 2021)

Sokoto
Sokoto State